Zabata is a 1993 Pakistani Double version Action film, directed by Jehangir Mughal and produced by Haji Ahsan Ali. The film stars actors Sultan Rahi, Babra Sharif, Asif Khan, Jehangir Mughal, and Humayun Qureshi.

References

External links 
  
 

1990s Punjabi-language films
1990s Urdu-language films
Punjabi-language Pakistani films
Urdu-language Pakistani films
Pakistani action films
Pakistani multilingual films